2015 Gainare Tottori season.

Competitions

J. League

Emperor's Cup
Beat Fagiano Okayama in the first round.
Lost to Roasso Kumamoto in the 2nd round.

League table

J3 League

References

External links
 J.League official site

Gainare Tottori
Gainare Tottori seasons